The Roosevelt Fire was a wildfire in Bridger-Teton National Forest in the U.S. state of Wyoming. The fire was reported by a hunting party on September 15, 2018; the party attempted to leave the area on September 16, but ideal fire conditions allowed for rapid growth and two of them were forced to jump into a creek to escape the flames. The hunters, a father and son, were transported to a local hospital then to a burn center in Salt Lake City. By Monday September 17, the fire had moved several miles east, triggering evacuations in residential areas northwest of Pinedale, Wyoming in its path. By September 18, the fire was moving northeast, prompting the evacuation of the Hoback Ranches subdivision south of the town of Bondurant for a total of 230 homes evacuated. On September 23 the fire was spreading rapidly to the east and north forcing authorities to close a fifty mile stretch of U.S. route 189/191 from mile marker 110 to 160 to clear the road for evacuations underway, however the highway was reopened the following day.

By September 25 U.S. route 189/191 was closed again at midday to allow firefighters to commence controlled burns to eliminate fuel in the path of the fire. Staffing was increased to 982 firefighters and support personnel consisting of 28 crews. 56 engines and 10 helicopters and aircraft were also assigned to the fire that has been to reported to have burned over 20 private residences. At least 500 persons had been evacuated with many unsure when they could return as electrical power had been turned off to help reduce the chances for the fire to spread. On September 27 officials reported that U.S. route 189/191 would be open during daytime but remain closed at night until the threat of the fire crossing the highway we eliminated. Fifty-five of the 150 homes in the Hoback Ranches subdivision
had been destroyed by the blaze and more than 1,000 firefighters were assigned to the incident. On October 2 the fire was estimated to have consumed  but rain was anticipated along with cooler daytime highs and higher humidity levels that were expected to help prevent further spread of the fire. The fire was reported as fully contained on October 5 though some smoke and smoldering would continue within the fire lines. After peaking at 1175 personnel, less than 50 firefighting personnel remained on the fire to perform mop up and to monitor the situation.

References 

2018 in Wyoming
Bridger–Teton National Forest
Wildfires in Wyoming